Gorka is a rural locality (a village) in Nizhne-Vazhskoye Rural Settlement, Verkhovazhsky District, Vologda Oblast, Russia. The population was 3 as of 2002.

Geography 
The distance to Verkhovazhye is 17.2 km, to Naumikha is 19.1 km. Voronovskaya, Bezymyannaya, Zveglevitsy, Istopochnaya are the nearest rural localities.

References 

Rural localities in Verkhovazhsky District